Potato babka  is a savoury dish, popular especially in Belarus and northeastern Poland, where it is known as babka ziemniaczana. It is made from grated potatoes, eggs, onions, and pieces of smoked, boiled or fried bacon and (especially in Poland) sausage. It is oven-baked in a crock, and often served with a sauce of sour cream and pork flitch. Depending on recipe and cooking method, it may be either a flaky potato pie or a heavy potato pudding.

In 2016, the claimed world's largest potato babka, 2 meters in diameter, was baked in the village of Sula, Belarus.

Similar dishes
The dish is similar to the Lithuanian kugelis and the Ashkenazi Jewish Potato Kugel, also known as Kartoffelkugel in Yiddish.

See also
 Draniki
 List of casserole dishes
 List of egg dishes
 List of potato dishes

References

Belarusian cuisine
Lithuanian cuisine
Polish cuisine
Potato dishes
Casserole dishes